Christian Gottfried Albert Traeger (12 June 1830 in Augsburg, Germany – 26 March 1912 in Charlottenburg) was a German privy councillor and parliamentarian of the Progressive People's Party and writer. German composer Amalie Scholl used his text for her song, “Einst wirst du schlummern.”

References

External links
 
 

1830 births
1912 deaths
Politicians from Augsburg
People from the Kingdom of Bavaria
German Lutherans
German Progress Party politicians
German Free-minded Party politicians
Free-minded People's Party (Germany) politicians
Progressive People's Party (Germany) politicians
Members of the 2nd Reichstag of the German Empire
Members of the 3rd Reichstag of the German Empire
Members of the 5th Reichstag of the German Empire
Members of the 6th Reichstag of the German Empire
Members of the 8th Reichstag of the German Empire
Members of the 9th Reichstag of the German Empire
Members of the 10th Reichstag of the German Empire
Members of the 11th Reichstag of the German Empire
Members of the 12th Reichstag of the German Empire
Members of the 13th Reichstag of the German Empire
19th-century Lutherans